MRP may refer to:

Business, economics and management
 Manufacturing resource planning, (MRP II), derived from/a followup to MRP/Material requirements planning
 Material requirements planning
 Maximum retail price, in India and Bangladesh
 Marginal revenue product, in the marginal revenue productivity theory of wages
 Market risk premium, a risk premium

Politics
 Papuan People's Assembly (Majelis Rakyat Papua), a cultural assembly for the indigenous people in Papua, Indonesia
 Molotov–Ribbentrop Pact, a non-aggression pact between Nazi Germany and the Soviet Union
 MRP-AEG, the Estonian Group on Publication of the Molotov-Ribbentrop Pact
 Mouvement Républicain Populaire (Popular Republican Movement), a political party during the Fourth French Republic

Science and technology
 Micronized rubber powder
 Multidrug resistance protein
 RNase MRP, a ribonucleoprotein
 Multilevel regression with poststratification, used in opinion polling 
 Modified Rodrigues parameters, in rotation formalisms in three dimensions
 Machine-readable passport

Computing
 Media Redundancy Protocol, allowing fast Ethernet recovery
 Metro Ring Protocol, proprietary networking protocol
 Multiple Registration Protocol in IEEE 802.1
 Managed Recovery Process in Oracle Data Guard

Other uses
 Mega Rice Project of Kalimantan, Indonesia
 Moorthorpe railway station (National Rail station code), England
 Monolithic Rail Platform, a gun part manufactured by Lewis Machine and Tool Company
 Master of Regional Planning, an urban planning qualification 
 Mr. Price, a South African retailer
 Mike Pompeo (Michael Richard Pompeo), American politician
 Mike Pence (Michael Richard Pence), American politician
 MRP:  Avi-Yonah, M., “Map of Roman Palestine” QDAP V, No. 4 (1936), 139-193. Egalement, Map of Roman Palestine, 2nd revised edition, Jerusalem, 1940. P.145
 Mohammad Reza Pahlavi, the last Shah of Iran

See also
 Manufacturing resource planning (MRP II)